The 2018 season was the Washington Redskins' 87th in the National Football League and their fifth under head coach Jay Gruden. This was the first season since 2011 that quarterback Kirk Cousins was not on the roster, as he joined the Minnesota Vikings in the offseason as a free agent. 

The team tied their record from the previous season, and missed the playoffs for the third straight season. Despite a 6–3 start which was their best since 2008 plus leading the NFC East, the team suffered a late-season collapse, suffering four straight losses after the team lost their starting quarterback Alex Smith to a catastrophic leg injury in their Week 11 loss to the Houston Texans. This would cause Smith to miss both the remainder of the 2018 season and the entire 2019 season as Smith stated that he had taken a total of 17 surgeries to repair his leg and nearly had it amputated. Smith's injury also resulted in a quarterback hangover. First, it forced Colt McCoy into the starting role in Weeks 12 and 13 before also suffering a leg injury in a 28–13 loss to the Philadelphia Eagles in Week 13, thus forcing the Redskins to start journeyman quarterback Mark Sanchez in Week 14 before starting another journeyman quarterback Josh Johnson against the Jacksonville Jaguars after benching Sanchez at halftime against the New York Giants. After the Alex Smith injury, the Redskins finished the last 7 games of the season with a record of 1–6. They were eliminated from playoff contention with a loss to the Titans, including wins by the Seahawks and Vikings. The team's season ended with 25 players on injured reserve, which were a league high.

Draft

Draft trades
The Redskins traded their third-round selection (78th overall) and cornerback Kendall Fuller to Kansas City in exchange for quarterback Alex Smith.
The Redskins traded safety Su'a Cravens and their fourth- (No. 113 overall) and fifth- (No. 149 overall) round selections to Denver in exchange for Denver's fourth- (No. 109 overall), two fifth-round selections (Nos. 142 and 163 overall) and a conditional 2020 selection.
The Redskins traded their sixth-round selection (No. 188 overall) to Cleveland in exchange for quarterback Kevin Hogan and Cleveland's sixth-round selection (No. 205 overall).
The Redskins traded tight end Derek Carrier to the Los Angeles Rams in exchange for the Rams' seventh-round selection (241st overall).

Supplemental Draft

 The Redskins selected Virginia Tech cornerback Adonis Alexander in the 2018 Supplemental draft. As a result, the team forfeited their 6th-round selection in the 2019 NFL Draft.

Staff

Final roster

Preseason

Regular season

Schedule

Note: Intra-division opponents are in bold text.

Game summaries

Week 1: at Arizona Cardinals
 The Redskins started off 1-0.

Week 2: vs. Indianapolis Colts
 Washington lost to Indianapolis, moving to 1-1.

Week 3: vs. Green Bay Packers
 The Redskins fought back and started a 2-1 record, heading to their bye week.

Week 5: at New Orleans Saints

The Redskins hoped to get revenge for their loss in this game a year ago, where they blew a 31-16 lead with three minutes remaining and lost in overtime. Instead, the Redskins got blown out. This game was the point where Drew Brees passed Brett Favre and Peyton Manning on most passing yards. The Redskins fell to 2-2.

Week 6: vs. Carolina Panthers

This marked the first time since 2006 that the Redskins had defeated the Panthers. Then the Redskins started a 3 game winning streak and improved to 3-2.

Week 7: vs. Dallas Cowboys
 The Redskins got their first win over the Cowboys at home since 2012. Also, Preston Smith forced a fumble returned for a touchdown off Dak Prescott. As time expired, Brett Maher missed the potential game-tying 52-yard field goal to give the Redskins the win. With this win, the Redskins improved to 4-2.

Week 8: at New York Giants
 The Redskins improved to 5-2. This was the last time the Redskins beat the Giants until 2021.

Week 9: vs. Atlanta Falcons
 The Redskins fell to 5-3.

Week 10: at Tampa Bay Buccaneers
 Then the Redskins improved to 6-3 but then Alex Smith got injured and they would only win 1 more time.

Week 11: vs. Houston Texans
During the game, starter Alex Smith suffered a compound fracture injury to his right leg after being sacked by J. J. Watt and Kareem Jackson and was replaced by his backup, Colt McCoy. Coincidentally, this was exactly 33 years to the day of Joe Theismann's career-ending leg injury.  Joe Theismann was also present during the game and witnessed the injury. The Redskins fell to 6-4 by losing 23-21, which ironically was the same score in the game where Theismann was injured. Alex Smith would not play again until Week 5 in 2020 against the Rams.

Week 12: at Dallas Cowboys
NFL on Thanksgiving Day
 The Redskins fell down to 6-5.

Week 13: at Philadelphia Eagles
 Redskins fell to 6-6.

Week 14: vs. New York Giants
 The Redskins fell down to 6-7.

Week 15: at Jacksonville Jaguars
 The Redskins improved to 7-7. The Redskins would then eclipse 600 regular season wins in franchise, the fifth team to do so (with Bears, Packers, Giants, & Steelers) with a regular season record of 600-588-28 at that point.

Week 16: at Tennessee Titans
 This loss dropped the Redskins to 7-8. Also with this loss, including wins by the Vikings and Seahawks eliminated the Redskins from playoff contention.

Week 17: vs. Philadelphia Eagles
 The Redskins finished 7-9 despite starting with a 6-3 record.

Standings

Division

Conference

References

External links
 

Washington
Washington Redskins seasons
Washington Redskins